Angela Mary "Angie" Sapik ( Vee; born August 1984) is an American sales professional and Republican politician from Douglas County, Wisconsin.  She is a member of the Wisconsin State Assembly, representing Wisconsin's 73rd Assembly district since January 2023.  The 73rd Assembly district is unique as one of the few remaining competitive seats in Wisconsin's legislative map.

Biography
Angie Sapik was born Angela Mary Vee and was raised in Superior, Wisconsin.  She graduated from Northwestern High School, in the town of Maple, Wisconsin, and went on to attend University of Wisconsin–Eau Claire for two years.  She ultimately earned her associate's degree from Duluth Business University.  For the last ten years, she has worked as a sales associate for her family business, Vee's Marketing, Inc.

Political career
After surviving the closest election in the Wisconsin Legislature in 2020, incumbent state representative Nick Milroy announced in April 2022 that he would not run for an 8th term in the Assembly that Fall.  A few weeks later, Sapik announced her candidacy for the Republican nomination in the 73rd district seat being vacated by Milroy.  She defeated Douglas County supervisor Scott Luostari in the Republican primary and went on to face child services consultant Laura Gapske in the general election.  In the November general election, the 73rd Assembly district was again one of the closest legislative races in the state.  Sapik prevailed by 490 votes.  

Angie Sapik assumed office January 3, 3023.

Personal life and family
Angela Vee is one of three children of Scott Vee.  Her father founded the produce company Vee's Marketing, Inc., in 1989.  Her father is now retired and her brother owns and runs the business.

Angela Vee took the last name Sapik when she married Nathan Sapik, in September 2012.  They live in Lake Nebagamon, Wisconsin, with their two children.

Electoral history

Wisconsin Assembly (2022)

| colspan="6" style="text-align:center;background-color: #e9e9e9;"| Republican Primary, August 9, 2022

| colspan="6" style="text-align:center;background-color: #e9e9e9;"| General Election, November 8, 2022

References

External links
 
 Angie Sapik at Wisconsin Vote
 Vee's Marketing, Inc.
 Angie's Tweets (opposition research website)

1984 births
Living people
Republican Party members of the Wisconsin State Assembly 
Women state legislators in Wisconsin  
People from Douglas County, Wisconsin
21st-century American women politicians